The United States House Natural Resources Subcommittee on Water, Wildlife and Fisheries is one of the five subcommittees within the House Natural Resources Committee. It was previously known as the Subcommittee on Water, Oceans and Wildlife.

Jurisdiction
In accordance with Rule 6. of the Committee on Natural Resources, the Subcommittee on Water, Oceans, and Wildlife has the following jurisdiction:
All measures and matters concerning water resources planning conducted pursuant to the Water Resources Planning Act, water resource research and development programs, and saline water research and development.
Compacts relating to the use and apportionment of interstate waters, water rights, and major interbasin water or power movement programs.
All measures and matters pertaining to irrigation and reclamation projects and other water resources development and recycling programs, including policies and procedures.
Indian water rights and settlements.
Activities and programs of the Water Resources Division or its successor within the U.S. Geological Survey.
The Endangered Species Act.
Fisheries management and fisheries research generally, including the management of all commercial and recreational fisheries (including the reauthorization of the Magnuson Stevens Fishery Conservation and Management Act), interjurisdictional fisheries, international fisheries agreements, aquaculture, seafood safety, and fisheries promotion.
All matters pertaining to the protection of coastal and marine environments, estuarine protection, and coastal barriers.
Oceanography.
Ocean engineering, including materials, technology, and systems.
Marine sanctuaries.
U.N. Convention on the Law of the Sea.
All matters regarding Antarctica within the Committee’s jurisdiction.
Sea Grant programs and marine extension services.
Cooperative efforts to encourage, enhance and improve international programs for the protection of the environment and the conservation of natural resources otherwise within the jurisdiction of the Subcommittee.
Coastal zone management.
Wildlife resources, including research, restoration, and conservation.
Measures and matters related to the U.S. Fish and Wildlife Service, including ecological services, fish and aquatic conservation, international affairs, migratory birds, national wildlife refuge system, wildlife and sport fish restoration, and the Lacey Act.
General and continuing oversight and investigative authority over activities, policies, and programs within the jurisdiction of the Subcommittee.

Members, 117th Congress

Historical membership rosters

116th Congress

115th Congress

Notes

References

External links
 Subcommittee page

Natural Resources Water